Leading Lady is the debut studio album by Australian singer Marina Prior, featuring the Melbourne Symphony Orchestra conducted by Brian Stacey. The album was released in November 1991 and peaked at number 15 on the ARIA Albums Chart in December and was certified platinum.

Track listing
 CD/ Cassette
 "I Dreamed a Dream" – from Les Misérables (musical)
 "If I Loved You" – from Carousel (musical) 
 "Wishing You Were Somehow Here Again" – from The Phantom of the Opera (1986 musical) 
 "Moonfall" – from The Mystery of Edwin Drood (musical)
 "All I Ask of You" – from The Phantom of the Opera (1986 musical) 
 "Before I Gaze at You Again" – from Camelot (musical)
 "Losing My Mind" – from Follies
 "There's Gotta Be Something Better Than This" – from Sweet Charity
 "Poor Wandering One" – from The Pirates of Penzance
 "Can't Help Lovin' Dat Man" – from Show Boat
 "The Last Man in My Life" – from Song and Dance
 "Wherever He Ain't" – from Mack and Mabel
 "Love Changes Everything" – from Aspects of Love
 "Somewhere Over the Rainbow" – from The Wizard of Oz

Charts

Certifications

Release history

References 

1991 debut albums
Marina Prior albums
Sony Music Australia albums
Melbourne Symphony Orchestra albums